La Cage aux Folles II is a 1980 French comedy film and the sequel to 1978's La Cage aux Folles. It is directed by Édouard Molinaro and stars Michel Serrault as Albin (stage name ZaZa), the female impersonator star of a gay night-club revue, and Ugo Tognazzi as Renato, his partner of over 20 years.

Plot
A spy plants a capsule of microfilm on Albin and from then on spies and government agents pursue him. Albin and Renato travel to Italy to hide at Renato's mother's farm. At each point along the way, we see the straight world's reaction to Albin.

Cast

 Michel Serrault as Albin Mougeotte/ZaZa Napoli
 Ugo Tognazzi as Renato Baldi
 Marcel Bozzuffi as Broca, chief of the government agents
 Michel Galabru as Simon Charrier
 Paola Borboni as Mrs. Baldi, Renato's mother
 Benny Luke as Jacob, Renato and Albin's housekeeper
 Giovanni Vettorazzo as Milan
 Glauco Onorato as Luigi
 Roberto Bisacco as Ralph
 Gianrico Tondinelli as Walter
 Giorgio Cerioni as Gunther
 Nazzareno Natale as Demis
 Antonio Francioni as Michaux
 Stelio Candelli as Hans
 Mark Bodin as Caramel, Albin's would-be replacement
 Tom Felleghy as Andrew Manderstam

Critical response

La Cage aux Folles II holds a 60% rating on Rotten Tomatoes based on five reviews.

Vincent Canby of The New York Times wrote "The film is as harmless, reassuring, sentimental and unsurprising as any prime-time situation comedy that has gone on too long." Gene Siskel of the Chicago Tribune gave the film 3 stars out of 4 and wrote "The new story is even less compelling than the old one, but this time the lead characters are more meaningful. 'Cage II' is a more poignant film, portraying the straight world as pursuers of power while the homosexuals seek love and beauty." Variety reported that the film was "markedly inferior" to the original and "is basically a Michael Serrault drag variety show ... There's little else here of interest or competence. Tognazzi has less to do than before and just fades into the background." Sheila Benson of the Los Angeles Times wrote "Nothing has changed. The plot has only thinned since the real story, Renato and Zaza's relationship, has already been so exhaustively explored." She noted, though, that the film "comes alive at the moments when it deals with double and triple role reversals." Lloyd Grove of The Washington Post wrote that "the sequel delivers the same punch lines to the same jokes, though this time there's a dash of international intrigue to keep things moving." Gilbert Adair of The Monthly Film Bulletin wrote that "the juxtaposition of campy histrionics with the dreariest type of espionage comedy offers quickly diminishing returns. A pity no worthier vehicle could have been found to reprise Michel Serrault's brilliant performances, the precision of whose comic mimicry can be compared without exaggeration to that of a kabuki female impersonator." Pauline Kael of The New Yorker wrote: " La Cage aux Folles II has nothing to do with the art of movies, but it has a great deal to do with the craft and art of acting, and the pleasures of farce. Serrault gives a superb comic performance - his Albin is a wildly fanciful creation. There's a grandeur about Albin's inability to see himself as he is. And maybe it's only in this exaggerated form that a movie about the ridiculousness and the tenderness of married love can be widely accepted now."

References

External links
 
 
 

1980 films
1980s French-language films
1980 comedy films
1980 LGBT-related films
French comedy films 
French LGBT-related films
French sequel films
Italian comedy films 
Italian LGBT-related films
Italian sequel films
Cross-dressing in film
Films directed by Édouard Molinaro
Films set in France
Films set in Sicily
Films shot in France
Films shot in Italy
Gay-related films
LGBT-related comedy films
United Artists films
Drag (clothing)-related films
1980s Italian films
1980s French films